This is a list of tennis players who have represented the Japan Davis Cup team in an official Davis Cup match. Japan have taken part in the competition since 1921.

Players

References

Lists of Davis Cup tennis players
Davis Cup